Szczawin Kościelny  is a village in Gostynin County, Masovian Voivodeship, in east-central Poland. It is the seat of the gmina (administrative district) called Gmina Szczawin Kościelny.

References

Villages in Gostynin County